The Hansa Bygg Kalmar Grand Prix is a single-day road cycling race held annually in Sweden since 2017. It is part of UCI Europe Tour in category 1.2.

Winners

References

External links

Cycle races in Sweden
UCI Europe Tour races
Recurring sporting events established in 2017
2017 establishments in Sweden